Nesapakkam is a locality in the K.K.Nagar which is part of the city of Chennai, India. It is situated between Virugambakkam and Ramapuram.

Neighbourhoods in Chennai